The filmography of Rutger Hauer lists all his performances as an actor in films, television films, and television series from 1969 to his death, and in upcoming posthumous films.

Hauer said in the documentary film Blond, Blue Eyes (2006) that, from the beginning of his acting career, he has turned down most of the roles which held little interest for him. He has rarely accepted a role for the money. Hauer has also said he might have been brilliant in only two or three films. He considers his performance in  The Legend of the Holy Drinker (1988) to have been one of these instances of brilliance.

Filmography

Film

Television

Video games

References

External links

Filmography Rutger Hauer at Allmovie
Filmography at Rutger Hauer's website

Hauer, Rutger